The 1978 Wisconsin–Whitewater Warhawks football team was an American football team that represented the University of Wisconsin–Whitewater as a member of the Wisconsin State University Conference (WSUC) during the 1978 NAIA Division I football season.

Schedule

References

Wisconsin–Whitewater
Wisconsin–Whitewater Warhawks football seasons
Wisconsin–Whitewater Warhawks football